Luis Carlos "Matador" Tejada Hansell (born 28 March 1982) is a Panamanian professional footballer who plays as a striker for Molinos El Pirata.

Club career
Tejada's debut in professional soccer was with Tauro in the local league, where he managed to make a good impression and quickly moved to Colombia to play with Colombian side Deportes Tolima. Later on he was transferred to first division team Envigado in 2004, and after a splendid participation in the Gold Cup, he set off to the United Arab Emirates.

In 2005, he signed a 3-year contract to send him to Al Ain of the United Arab Emirates. However, he did not yield the same results he obtained in the Gold Cup, reason why shortly after finished the AFC Champions League, and he returned to Panama.

Returning to Panama, he participated in the championship of Clausura of ANAPROF with the Plaza Amador, one of the best teams of the local football league, but he only participated in a few matches. His conditioning was not optimal, and he acquired the nickname of "el gordito (fatty)". Growing into better form, he moved on to Colombia, where he played a short spell with ex Copa Libertadores champions Once Caldas, from which he was fired for disciplinary problems. He then returned to Panama to play for Plaza Amador.

Real Salt Lake of Major League Soccer announced the signing of Tejada on 12 December 2006, for the 2007 season.  He played only two minutes in five games, however, before he was released by head coach Jason Kreis. He returned to Panamanian side Tauro, but did not play very much since he was shortly signed by Colombian side América de Cali. He scored 4 goals during his short stay in Panama.

Matador scored only 3 goals in the Torneo Finalizacion 2007; however, he became a key player for América in the next tournament. Tejada played 19 games in the Torneo Iniciacion 2008 where he scored 12 goals, becoming América de Cali's top-scorer and the second in the tournament. Tejada reached the final where America lost to Boyacá Chicó. He was nicknamed by the Colombian press as America's golden tooth (el diente de oro del America) because of his golden tooth. After the tournament, there was much interest for Tejada, including from Argentine side River Plate; however, nothing was concrete. Unfortunately for the Matador América could not pay his salary and price so he was sold to Bogotá's side Millonarios where he debuted on 16 August 2008 in the Embajadores victory over Deportes Quindío. After an unsuccessful spell at Millonarios. Tejada returned once more to Tauro and afterwards moved to Peru to play for champions Juan Aurich. At Juan Aurich, Tejada scored an impressive 48 goals in 65 games and attracted interest from teams in stronger leagues such as Mexico and Brazil. Tejada finally moved to Mexican side Deportivo Toluca in late 2012 as a replacement for the Uruguyan striker Iván Alonso. His spell at Toluca began promising after a late arrival, scoring 4 goals in 5 matches; however, his performance and consistency dropped for the liguilla, the Clausura 2013 and in the disappointing performance of Toluca at Copa Libertadores. In summer 2013 he joined Veracruz.

In December 2013, Tejada returned to Peru where he played with Juan Aurich for two years. He joined Universidad César Vallejo.

On 1 March 2015, Tejada walked off the pitch during a match against Cienciano after being subjected to racist abuse from fans.

International career
Tejada made his debut for Panama in a June 2001 friendly match against Trinidad and Tobago and has, as of 1 August 2015, earned a total of 88 caps, scoring 40 goals and making him Panama's all-time record goalscorer just ahead of Blas Pérez. He represented his country in 24 FIFA World Cup qualification matches and in March 2005, Tejada scored a goal from an overhead kick against Mexico in a World Cup 2006 qualifying match that gave Panama a 1:1 tie against the CONCACAF giants. This goal was voted the best goal of the year by Fox Sports.

Tejada led Panama to the 2005 CONCACAF Gold Cup final, where they finished as runners-up to the United States. He scored three goals to end up as joint top scorer, but unfortunately, he missed his penalty kick in the penalty shoot-out against the United States in the final. He was named the Most Valuable Player of the tournament for his efforts. Tejada is currently the all-time leading scorer in Panama history.

Tejada was ejected from the 2015 CONCACAF Gold Cup semi final against Mexico after receiving a red card.

In May 2018, he was named in Panama's 23-man squad for the 2018 FIFA World Cup in Russia.

International goals
Scores and results list Panama's goal tally first.

Honours
Juan Aurich
 Peruvian First Division: 2011
Individual
 CONCACAF Gold Cup MVP: 2005
 CONCACAF Gold Cup Best XI: 2005
 CONCACAF Gold Cup Top Goalscorer: 2005

See also
 List of top international men's football goalscorers by country
 List of men's footballers with 100 or more international caps

References

External links
 
 
 
 

1982 births
Living people
Sportspeople from Panama City
Association football forwards
Panamanian footballers
Panama international footballers
2005 CONCACAF Gold Cup players
2007 UNCAF Nations Cup players
2009 CONCACAF Gold Cup players
2011 CONCACAF Gold Cup players
2015 CONCACAF Gold Cup players
Copa América Centenario players
Tauro F.C. players
C.D. Plaza Amador players
Deportes Tolima footballers
Envigado F.C. players
Al Ain FC players
Once Caldas footballers
Real Salt Lake players
Boyacá Chicó F.C. footballers
América de Cali footballers
Millonarios F.C. players
Juan Aurich footballers
Deportivo Toluca F.C. players
C.D. Veracruz footballers
Club Deportivo Universidad César Vallejo footballers
Club Universitario de Deportes footballers
Sport Boys footballers
Panamanian expatriate footballers
Expatriate footballers in Colombia
Expatriate footballers in the United Arab Emirates
Expatriate soccer players in the United States
Expatriate footballers in Peru
Expatriate footballers in Mexico
Panamanian expatriate sportspeople in Colombia
Panamanian expatriate sportspeople in the United Arab Emirates
Panamanian expatriate sportspeople in the United States
Panamanian expatriate sportspeople in Peru
Panamanian expatriate sportspeople in Mexico
Liga Panameña de Fútbol players
Major League Soccer players
Peruvian Primera División players
Liga MX players
UAE Pro League players
Categoría Primera A players
2018 FIFA World Cup players
FIFA Century Club